Keelu Gurram is a 1949 Indian Telugu-language swashbuckler film produced and directed by Raja Saheb of Mirzapuram under the Sobhanachala Pictures banner. It stars Akkineni Nageswara Rao and Anjali Devi, with music composed by Ghantasala. The film marks the debut of Ghantasala as a composer who would later become a noted composer and playback singer .

Fascinated by the commercial success of folklore films, Raja of Mirzapuram asked his writers to come up with a similar subject. Tapi Dharma Rao assisted by the noted story-teller Sadasivabrahmam (uncredited) wrote the story of the film which is inspired by Kasi Majili Kathalu. Chitrapu Narayanamurthy, who had earlier directed all of Raja’s productions wrote the screenplay. Narayanamurthy also ghost directed most of the scenes for the Raja.

The film released on 19 February 1949. Keelu Gurram was a big hit and celebrated a 148-day run at Maruthi Talkies in Vijayawada and hundred-day run at 10 other centres. It was also the first Telugu film dubbed into Tamil. After Balaraju (1948), Keelugurram established Nageswara Rao as the much sought-after hero.

Plot
The King of Vidarbha is attracted to a Yakshini called Guna Sundari when he goes out hunting with his aide. He brings her to his kingdom as his second wife. She is a demon who eats elephants and horses in the fort at night, leaving bones. According to her plan, she manages to shift the blame onto the Queen. The king punishes the pregnant queen and asks his commander to kill her by taking her into a forest. But the commander feels sorry for her. He does not kill her, but blinds her by removing her eyeballs and takes them as a proof that he killed her. He hands them over to Guna Sundari. She secretly keeps them with her sister.

She gives birth to a son Vikrama and was rescued by forest dwellers. He grows up there without knowing his past and learns all the fighting skills. One day, because of a petty fight with the son of the chieftain of their tribe, he learns about his past through his mother. He leaves the forest without telling his mother.

In the kingdom, there is an announcement that the princess of the Anga kingdom was kidnapped by an unknown witch, if anybody finds and bring her back, they will be awarded half of the kingdom and the princess herself as a bride. Three intelligent people in the city, a fortune teller, a blacksmith, and a priest wish to win the reward. Through their magical powers, they find that the princess is hidden very far away across three oceans on a mountain surrounded by dangerous creatures. To reach there, they design a mechanical horse (Keelu Gurram) which can fly. After they finish making it, they are afraid of riding on it. So they take it to the king and ask him if there is any brave young man in the kingdom who can ride on it.

Vikrama just reaches the kingdom and rides on Keelu Gurram (Mechanical horse), he wins the king's attention. He is also able to stop the Yakshini from eating the horses and elephants with the help of that horse. He was given the Sainyadhikari (Chief of Army) position due to his bravery. The Yakshini now finding it difficult to fulfill her wishes, wants to eliminate Vikrama. She pretends that she has a severe headache and asks the king to send Vikrama to bring a medicinal herb for her headache. So he set on to the journey on his magical horse. On the way, he saves a queen, who is about to be killed by a cruel conjurer in order to possess great powers. He rests in her place for some time. She finds a small note in which it is written that "Dear elder Sister, whoever brings this letter to you, is causing me a lot of trouble. As soon as he hands over this letter to you, gobble him up". She suspects something and changes the letter so that he will be treated well by her.

Vikrama tricks her and gets hold of the princess, his mother's eyeballs and also two insects, which hold the life of Yakshinis. On the way back he is deceived by the three makers of the magical horse, but manages to survive. He reaches the kingdom, while his mother is sentenced to death by hanging. He kills Mohini, saves his mother, and restores her dignity.

Cast

 Akkineni Nageswara Rao as Vikrama
 Anjali Devi as Guna Sundari, a Yakshini
 A. V. Subba Rao as Prachanda Maharaju
 Relangi as Govindudu
 D. Satyanarayana as Mahamantri Sumantha
 V. Koteswara Rao as Pratapa Shilpa
 Pucha Viswanatham as Vasudeva
 K. V. Manikya Rao Naidu as Sishya
 M. Kondayya as Rudra
 Ramanatha Sastry as Maharaju
 Suryashree as Vidyavathi
 Balamani as Prabhavathi
 Lakshmirajyam Jr. as Sugunavathi
 T. Kanakam as Keekini
 Surabhi Kamalabai

Soundtrack

Music was composed by Ghantasala. Lyrics were written by Tapi Dharma Rao. Music released on HMV Audio Company.

Box Office
 The film ran for more than 100 days in 11 centers in Andhra Pradesh.

References

External links
 
 Listen to Keelugurram songs at Raaga.com

1949 films
1940s Telugu-language films
Indian fantasy adventure films
Indian black-and-white films
1940s fantasy adventure films